Caroline Hargrove  (née Hogue) is Chief Technical Officer of Zedsen. She previously served as CTO at Babylon Health, McLaren Applied Technologies and as a visiting professor at the University of Oxford.

Early life and education 
Hargrove is from Montreal, Quebec. She studied mathematics and mechanical engineering at Queen's University, Ontario, which she graduated in 1989.

Career 
After her postgraduate studies, Hargrove remained at the University of Cambridge as a Fellow. She joined McLaren in 1997, where she worked in vehicle dynamics. For ten years she was responsible for the McLaren F1 simulator. She was one of the founders of McLaren Applied Technologies. In 2013 Hargrove was appointed Technical Director at McLaren Applied Technologies. Her job involved R&D strategy and IP development. She championed the use of big data in motor racing.  Here she looks to translate the technology of McLaren F1 to medical services, developing analysis and support tools. She works with Olympic athletes and the UK track cycling team. She created a data-logger that mounts under the saddle to collect information of speed, power, tilt and torque, then send it to the coach. Her team translated the 3D accelerometers from Formula One cars into sensors for human use, working with GlaxoSmithKline to monitor patient's response to drugs.

In 2014 she appeared on BBC Radio 4, where she discussed how Britain became a world leader in Formula One cars. In 2016 she announced the use of their simulator for testing domestic vehicles. In 2016 she was named one of the Women's Engineering Society and The Daily Telegraph's Top 50 Influential Women in Engineering.

In 2018 she became the CTO of Babylon Health, focussing on the use of AI to diagnose patients.

In April 2021 she was named as CTO of Zedsen, a UK based startup that provides non-invasive blood sugar monitoring technology.

Hargrove is an advocate for increasing the number of girls and women in engineering through visits to schools and on-site work experience.

Awards and honours
Hargrove was elected a Fellow of the Royal Academy of Engineering in 2017. She was announced as one of the Top 50 Innovators in the World in 2017 by Codex. She is a Visiting Professor at the University of Oxford.

She was appointed Commander of the Order of the British Empire (CBE) in the 2020 New Year Honours for services to engineering.

References 

Year of birth missing (living people)
Living people
Fellows of the Royal Academy of Engineering
Female Fellows of the Royal Academy of Engineering
Alumni of the University of Cambridge
Queen's University at Kingston alumni
21st-century women engineers
People from Montreal
Canadian emigrants to England
Commanders of the Order of the British Empire
Canadian mechanical engineers
British mechanical engineers